Arthabaska Regional County Municipality is a regional county municipality located in the Centre-du-Québec region of Quebec. Its seat is Victoriaville.

Subdivisions
There are 23 subdivisions within the RCM:

Cities & Towns (4)
 Daveluyville
 Kingsey Falls
 Victoriaville
 Warwick

Municipalities (14)
 Chesterville
 Maddington Falls
 Notre-Dame-de-Ham
 Saint-Albert
 Sainte-Clotilde-de-Horton
 Sainte-Élizabeth-de-Warwick
 Sainte-Hélène-de-Chester
 Saint-Louis-de-Blandford
 Saint-Norbert-d'Arthabaska
 Saint-Rémi-de-Tingwick
 Saint-Samuel
 Saint-Valère
 Tingwick

Parishes (4)
 Saint-Christophe-d'Arthabaska
 Sainte-Séraphine
 Saint-Rosaire
 Saints-Martyrs-Canadiens

Townships (1)
 Ham-Nord

Demographics
Mother tongue from 2016 Canadian Census

Attractions
 Cinq-Chicots School of the Row (Saint-Christophe-d'Arthabaska)
 LaPierre Mill (Norbertville)
 Laurier Museum (Victoriaville)
 Marie-Victorin Park (Kingsey Falls)
 Postes Pavilion Hotel (Victoriaville)
 Rivière Nicolet Trout Fishing Post (Notre-Dame-de-Ham)
 Saint-Michel Mountain (Victoriaville)
 St-Médard Church (1874) (Warwick)

Transportation

Access Routes
Highways and numbered routes that run through the municipality, including external routes that start or finish at the county border:

 Autoroutes
 
 

 Principal Highways
 
 
 
 
 

 Secondary Highways
 
 
 
 
 

 External Routes
 None

See also
 List of regional county municipalities and equivalent territories in Quebec

References

External links
 Arthabaska RCM
 Répertoire des municipalités: Centre-du-Québec